George Iulian Leață (born 5 June 2004) is a Romanian professional footballer who plays as an attacking midfielder for Liga II club CSM Slatina, on loan from CFR Cluj.

Club career
Leață made his debut for CFR Cluj on 22 May 2022, in a 3–1 Liga I loss to FCSB.

Career statistics

Club

Honours
CFR Cluj
Liga I: 2021–22

References

External links
 
 

2004 births
Living people
People from Dâmbovița County
Romania youth international footballers
Romanian footballers
Association football midfielders
Liga I players
Liga II players
CFR Cluj players
CSM Slatina footballers